Reinforced Regional Task Force, prior to 2015 officially known as Piketen (or Piketenheten) is a regional special operations asset of the Swedish Police Authority, similar to SWAT type units in the United States. RRTF is called upon when situations occur that are too dangerous for ordinary police to handle such as hostage situations, serving high-risk arrest warrants and confronting armed criminals. RRTF units are based in Stockholm, Gothenburg and Malmö.

History
The main responsibility of the RRTF is interventions in dangerous situations or dangerous environments, e.g. hostage situations and situations including armed dangerous suspects. Other duties are riot control, escorting VIP's/objects of value and serving high-risk arrest warrants etc.

RRTF, formerly known as Piketen, has been active since 1979. Its creation was an answer to the events of the Norrmalmstorg robbery in 1973, where robber Jan-Erik "Janne" Olsson took four hostages at Kreditbanken at Norrmalmstorg ("Norrmalm's Square") in Stockholm.

RRTF operators from Malmö and Gothenburg have been deployed with the EULEX Intervention Group in Kosovo (Special Team Six), tasked with high-risk operations such as hostage rescue and arresting armed criminals.

In 2011, the RRTF officially opened up for any female officers who wish to serve in the unit though none have passed selection yet.

Due to the major reorganization efforts of 2015, Piketen was reclassified as "Förstärkt Regional Insatsstyrka", or in English, "Reinforced Regional Task Force", RRTF.

Organization
The RRTFs are stationed in the three largest cities of Sweden: Stockholm, Gothenburg and Malmö, providing a day round, year round tactical intervention capability in Police regions Stockholm, West and South. However the units can at request be put to use nationwide all over Sweden. 

The RRTFs are part of the National Intervention Concept (NIK). Launched in 2015, this concept standardized and regulated the employment, structure and capabilities of the Swedish polices tactical units. The NIK divides the various tactical units into three levels of capabilities: 

National capability: Provided by the NTF

Reinforced regional capability: Provided by the RRTF (Piketen) in regions Stockholm, West and South.

General regional capability: Provided by regional tactical teams dispersed throughout their respective region. This capability exists in regions North, East, Mid and Bergslagen.

Training 
The RRTFs spend about 30% of their time on training, which is mainly focused on high-risk intervention. For example; one or multiple dangerous perpetrators in rural terrain or in an urban environment and perpetrators in houses or vehicles (also including hostage rescue). Such dangerous interventions require a lot of advanced tactical training. The units strives to resolve any given situation as calmly as possible to avoid injury or loss of life and uses highly trained negotiators when tactically possible. Circumstances dictate whether officers operate in uniform or civilian clothing. They mostly make use of unmarked civilian vehicles, primarily Toyota Land Cruisers and Volkswagen Multivans, or special assault vehicles.

The unit's officers are well-trained in different methods of entry (MOE), such as rappelling and door breaching. They also receive training in close target reconnaissance, close quarters battle, TCCC, self-defense, and various weapon systems. Officers are then specially trained as medics, breachers, specialist drivers etc.

To be eligible for RRTF selection an officer must have at least 18 months of service, but exceptions can be made if the applicant possesses skills or experiences valuable for the units. After a series of physical and psychological tests successful applicants progress to a final week long field exercise, commonly known as "hell week". Applicants who successfully complete "hell week" then progress to 6 months of training before claiming an operational slot with their unit. The selection and training process has an attrition rate of roughly 90%.

Gear
The main weapons of the RRTFs are the Heckler & Koch MP5 and Heckler & Koch G36C, the latter having since been replaced by the LWRC M6. The issued sidearm is the standard police issue SIG Sauer 226. The RRTFs did have sniper rifles on trial but the project was scrapped as the usage of both sniper rifles and EMOE (explosive breaching) was limited to the counter-terrorism unit of the Swedish police, the National Task Force. As of late 2018, LWRC REPR rifles in 7.62 had been issued to the RRTFs, effectively reintroducing the sniper capability at the units. 

All operators are equipped with ballistic Ops Core helmets, plate carriers and flame retardant clothing.

Both the NTF and RRTF's were equipped with Sandcats these vehicles have since been transferred to the Police EOD.

Similar units 
  – National Task Force
  – SEK
  – RAID
  – FBI SWAT

Footnotes

Notes and references

External links
 Efterlyst Special: Piketen May–June, 2013 on TV3; 2x40 min. Swedish-language documentary series about the unit.

See also 

 Law enforcement by country
 List of special law enforcement units

Law enforcement agencies of Sweden
Non-military counterterrorist organizations
Police tactical units